Sutton Trinity F.C. was a football club based in Nottinghamshire. It competed in the Midland Football League, Northern Counties East League and Central Midlands League.

References

Defunct football clubs in Nottinghamshire
Central Midlands Football League
Midland Football League (1889)
Northern Counties East Football League